Victor Hănescu was the defending champion, but lost in the second round to Florent Serra.

Thomaz Bellucci won in the final 6–4, 7–6(7–2), against Andreas Beck.

Seeds

Draw

Finals

Top half

Bottom half

References

External links
Main Draw
Qualifying Draw

Singles